The Gumpert Apollo was a sports car produced by German automotive manufacturer Gumpert Sportwagenmanufaktur GmbH in Altenburg. Gumpert filed for bankruptcy in August 2013, thereby ending the production of the Apollo.

History

In 2000, Roland Gumpert proposed a new generation of sports cars. One of the primary criteria for this car was that it be street-legal yet ready for the racetrack. He returned to Germany at the end of 2001, after over three years in China where he was the head of sales and marketing responsible for the development of the dealer network of the Audi-VW joint enterprise there. Subsequently, automobile designer Roland Mayer asked him if he would assist in building a prototype sports car. Audi approved Gumpert's involvement in this project, on the condition that, if they did eventually develop a new sports car, it would not be a prototype, but a series product.

The company, located in Altenburg, Germany was founded in 2004 under the name GMG Sportwagenmanufaktur Altenburg GmbH. The technical guidelines were defined and the first designs of the car were drawn by Marco Vanetta. Upon Vanetta's completion of this process, the first 1:4 scale model of Gumpert's car was produced in 2001.

Gumpert continued with the development of the Apollo, along with the Technical University of Munich and the Ingolstadt University of Applied Sciences. They assisted him with the constructional work, computer simulations, and wind tunnel tests. This research and development helped forming the blueprint for the first 1:1 scale model. Finally, two prototype cars were constructed. Production of the Apollo started in October 2005.

Soon after the first fully functioning road car made its way to Europe, the car became fully road-legal and was sold in various Gumpert dealerships. Very soon after, car reviewers praised the car's speed and cornering. During a review in Autocar magazine, chief test driver Matt Prior stated that "the Apollo recalibrates the meaning of pure speed and driving feel." On Series 11 of Top Gear, the Apollo lapped the Top Gear test track in a time of 1:17.1, setting a record that lasted for 2 years until surpassed by the Bugatti Veyron Super Sport.

Motorsport

In April 2005, the Apollo made its racing debut in the Divinol Cup. It was driven by Belgian race car driver Ruben Maes; he finished third on the Hockenheimring race track. Three years later Gumpert announced that they would enter a hybrid version of the Apollo in the 2008 24 Hours Nürburgring, driven by 2004 winner Dirk Müller and ex-Formula One racer Heinz-Harald Frentzen. Three months passed between the first discussions and the finished hybrid Apollo. The Apollo was driven in the 24 Hours Nürburgring in May 2008. The car has the ability to recharge the battery under braking.

Design

It is a mid-engine, rear wheel drive two-seater constructed on a tubular chromoly frame, with fiberglass or optional carbon fibre body panels.

The Apollo set a 7:11.57 lap time at Nürburgring achieved by German car magazine Sport Auto.

Engine

The Apollo uses a 4,163 cc bi-turbo intercooled version of the Audi V8 engine. The 90° V8 has a closed-deck light metal crankcase with dry sump lubrication. The light metal cylinder heads have five valves per cylinder, four overhead camshafts, VarioCam Direct variable valve timing on the intakes, and hydraulic valve clearance compensation. The double-flow exhaust system has four oxygen sensors to monitor the gas mixture, and a 3-way catalytic converter. Modern controls include an on-board diagnostic system, eight-coil electronic ignition, sequential multipoint fuel injection, and an electronic (drive by wire) accelerator system.

There are 3 engine types available:
 Base version - approximately 
 Sport version - approximately 
 Race version - approximately 

Speed overview (650 hp):

 Top speed: 
 0-: 3.1 seconds
 0-: 9.1 seconds

References

External links

Gumpert Sportwagenmanufaktur
 Gumpert USA

Rear mid-engine, rear-wheel-drive vehicles
Cars of Germany
Cars introduced in 2005
Automobiles with gull-wing doors
First car made by manufacturer
Racing cars
Sports cars
Coupés